Trevesia burckii is a  flowering plant in the family Araliaceae found from Sumatra to Borneo

References

External links
 
 

burckii
Flora of Sumatra
Flora of Borneo
Taxa named by Jacob Gijsbert Boerlage